Theodore Thomas More Agnew, Baron Agnew of Oulton,  (born 17 January 1961) is a British businessman, Conservative life peer and former Minister of State at the Cabinet Office and HM Treasury. He also founded the Inspiration Trust, and is the Trust's former chairman.

Early life
He was born in Norfolk, brought up in Oulton near Aylsham and educated at Beeston Hall School and Rugby School. After school, he worked in Canada and Australia, initially in farming but later buying and selling a variety of businesses.

Career
After working in Australia, he returned to the UK, founded Town & Country Assistance in 1989, and grew the business to annual gross revenues of £40 million. Selling it to Warburg Pincus in 2002, he became co-founder of WNS Global Services. He resigned as a non-executive director of Jubilee Managing Agency Ltd in 2011, a Lloyd's insurance business managing £130 million of premiums.

He has a financial interest in the artificial intelligence company Faculty.

He is a past trustee of Policy Exchange, a Westminster-based think tank. He served as chairman of the Norfolk Community Foundation in 2013 but remains a vice patron.

Agnew is the founder and chairman of the Inspiration Trust, a multi-academy trust that runs fourteen schools in East Anglia. The Trust was founded as the East Norfolk Academy Trust on 14 August 2012, changing its name to the Inspiration Trust on 27 January 2013.

Agnew was a non-executive board member of the Department for Education and chairman of its Academies Board from 2013 to 2015. He was appointed lead non-executive board member of the Ministry of Justice in July 2015.

Agnew is a board member of the Education Policy Institute, a Westminster-based research institute.

1997 General Election

Theodore Agnew joined James Goldsmith's Referendum Party some time before the 1997 General Election and was selected as their Prospective Parliamentary Candidate for the Ipswich constituency.

In the ensuing poll he garnered 1,637 votes (3.4%), coming fourth after Nigel Roberts (5881, 12.2%). The seat was held by Labour's Jamie Cann (25,484, 52.7%) – a 10.4% swing to Labour.

Education minister 
Agnew was appointed as Parliamentary Under-Secretary of State for the School System, in the Department for Education, on 28 September 2017. He had an interest in improving the cost base of schools. He was created Baron Agnew of Oulton, of Oulton in the county of Norfolk, on 19 October 2017, sitting with the Conservative Party group in the House of Lords.

Treasury/Cabinet Office Minister 
Agnew became Minister of State for Efficiency and Transformation jointly at the Cabinet Office and HM Treasury on 14 February 2020.

Agnew had a senior role in the UK's vaccination effort during the COVID-19 pandemic. He referred two companies to the PPE fast or VIP lane: Worldlink Resources, advised by former MP Brooks Newmark, which gained contracts for £258 million, and Uniserve, which gained an additional contract for £304 million. In April 2021 he was accused of a conflict of interest over his shares in Public Group, a firm helping companies bid for government contracts.

Resignation 
On 24 January 2022, Agnew resigned as Minister of State for Efficiency and Transformation after strongly criticising the government's failure to tackle billions of pounds worth of fraud in the Coronavirus Bounce Back Loan Scheme. Agnew said "a combination of arrogance, indolence and ignorance" was "freezing the government machine". Agnew accused the government of making "schoolboy errors" through giving loans to more than 1,000 companies which were not trading when the pandemic happened.

Post ministerial career 
He endorsed Kemi Badenoch in the July 2022 Conservative Party leadership election.

Personal life
Agnew donated a total of £134,000 to the Conservative Party between 2007 and 2009.

Honours
Agnew was appointed a deputy lieutenant (DL) of Norfolk in 2013. He was made a Knight Bachelor in the 2015 New Year Honours "for services to education".

Notes

References

|-

1961 births
British businesspeople
Conservative Party (UK) life peers
Life peers created by Elizabeth II
Deputy Lieutenants of Norfolk
Knights Bachelor
Living people
People educated at Beeston Hall School
People educated at Rugby School
People from Broadland (district)